Denis Sergeyevich Yevsikov (born 19 February 1981) is a Russian football coach and a former defender.

Honours
 Russian Premier League winner: 2003.
 Russian Premier League runner-up: 2002.
 Russian Cup winner: 2002.
 Russian Cup runner-up: 2000.
 Top 33 players year-end list: 2002.

International career
Yevsikov played his first game for Russia on 12 February 2003 in a friendly against Cyprus.

External links 
  Profile
 
 

1981 births
People from Vladimir, Russia
Living people
Russian footballers
Association football defenders
Russia under-21 international footballers
Russia international footballers
PFC CSKA Moscow players
FC Lokomotiv Moscow players
FC Akhmat Grozny players
PFC Spartak Nalchik players
FC Tom Tomsk players
Russian Premier League players
Russian football managers
Sportspeople from Vladimir Oblast